This is a list of public universities in Oklahoma that offer four year degrees. It does not include private universities and colleges that offer two year degrees.

There are currently 15  universities within the state of Oklahoma, listed in alphabetical order (noting the average annual in-state undergraduate fees):

Cameron University, Lawton, Oklahoma ($2,571)
East Central University, Ada, Oklahoma ($2,663)
Langston University, Langston, Oklahoma ($2,409)
Northeastern State University, Tahlequah, Oklahoma ($2,895)
Northwestern Oklahoma State University, Alva, Oklahoma ($3,232)
Oklahoma Panhandle State University, Goodwell, Oklahoma ($2,490)
Oklahoma State University - Okmulgee, Okmulgee, Oklahoma ($2,535)
Oklahoma State University - Stillwater, Stillwater, Oklahoma (3,585)
Rogers State University, Claremore, Oklahoma ($2,483)
Southeastern Oklahoma State University, Durant, Oklahoma ($3,249)
Southwestern Oklahoma State University, Weatherford, Oklahoma ($3,000)
University of Central Oklahoma, Edmond, Oklahoma, ($3,315)
University of Oklahoma Health Sciences Center, Oklahoma City, Oklahoma ($3,261)
University of Oklahoma, Norman, Oklahoma ($3,261)
University of Science and Arts of Oklahoma, Chickasha, Oklahoma ($2,304)

Oklahoma
Public Universities